Ectoedemia klimeschi is a moth of the family Nepticulidae. It is found in eastern and south-eastern Europe, where it is especially common in the Danube basin, from western Germany to Romania. It has also been recorded from eastern Germany, Poland, Switzerland and northern Italy.

The wingspan is 6–8.2 mm. Adults are on wing in June and July. There is one generation per year.

The larvae feed on Populus alba. They mine the leaves of their host plant. It initially bores in the petiole, causing a gall-like swelling. After the last moult, the larva enters the leaf and creates a blotch. The larva mainly feeds and night, and retreats into the petiole at daytime. Pupation takes place outside of the mine.

External links
Fauna Europaea
bladmineerders.nl
A Taxonomic Revision Of The Western Palaearctic Species Of The Subgenera Zimmermannia Hering And Ectoedemia Busck s.str. (Lepidoptera, Nepticulidae), With Notes On Their Phylogeny

Nepticulidae
Moths of Europe
Moths described in 1933